Craig Kielburger Secondary School , commonly referred to as C.K is a high school in Milton, Ontario, Canada. The two-storey school features barrier-free accessibility, a triple gym, studio/theatre, food school and technical education facilities and the IB Diploma program. This school replaces E.C. Drury High School which closed in June 2012. The school is named after Craig Kielburger who founded Free the Children. Kielburger visited the school for the grand opening October 9, 2012.

Academics
Craig Kielburger Secondary School offers courses in all four pathways; University, College, Apprenticeship and Workplace.

Special programs
IB Diploma program 
French Immersion is a program designed to help students become fluent in French.
The Centre provides education and training for developmentally challenged students.
ESL/ELD High School Program provides English as a second language training for High School students.
Specialist High Skills Majors (SHSM)
Transportation
Green Industries
Hospitality
Information and Communications Technology
Arts and Culture
Social Justice
Business

Ontario Youth Apprenticeship (OYAP)
Hair Styling

Sports teams
The CKSS Spartan Wrestling Team has developed a tradition of winning team and individual medals at regional (GHAC) and provincial (OFSAA) tournaments since 1987.

At the 2015 OFSAA Championship, the CKSS Spartan Wrestling Team proved that they are the most dominant team in Ontario by winning the boys team title.

The CKSS Spartan Football Team was formed in 2013

The CKSS Junior Field Hockey Team made it to the playoffs for the first time in 2013.

In 2014, the CKSS Junior Field Hockey Team won the Tier 2 Halton Junior Field Hockey Championship.

In 2017, the CKSS Senior Field Hockey Team finished 4th at the OFSAA Provincial Field Hockey Championship.

Non-Sports teams
FIRST Robotics Competition Team 4992, Sparbotics.
2014 Waterloo Regional Finalists.
2018 Ontario Regional Semis.

Arts
The arts department at Craig Kielburger Secondary School has extra curricular activities including Neon, Choir, Fall Show (Formerly Junior Show), Senior Show and One-Acts.

See also
List of high schools in Ontario

References

External links

High schools in the Regional Municipality of Halton
Milton, Ontario
2012 establishments in Ontario
Educational institutions established in 2012